Scincella rupicola  is a species of skink found in Vietnam.

References

Scincella
Reptiles described in 1916
Taxa named by Malcolm Arthur Smith